Todor Petkov Kolev (born 29 April 1942) is a Bulgarian former football defender who played for Bulgaria in the 1970 FIFA World Cup. He also played for PFC Slavia Sofia.

References

External links
FIFA profile

1942 births
Living people
Bulgarian footballers
Bulgaria international footballers
PFC CSKA Sofia players
FC Botev Vratsa players
FC Lokomotiv 1929 Sofia players
PFC Slavia Sofia players
First Professional Football League (Bulgaria) players
1970 FIFA World Cup players
Association football defenders
People from Harmanli
Sportspeople from Haskovo Province